The Honma TourWorld Cup was a professional golf tournament on the Japan Golf Tour. It was first played in 2015, and was held at Ishioka Golf Club in Omitama, Ibaraki for two years before moving to Kyowa Country Club in Toyota, Aichi. The purse for the final event in 2017 was ¥100,000,000, with ¥20,000,000 going to the winner.

Winners

External links
Coverage on the Japan Golf Tour's official site

Former Japan Golf Tour events
Defunct golf tournaments in Japan
Sport in Aichi Prefecture
Sport in Ibaraki Prefecture
Recurring sporting events established in 2015
Recurring sporting events disestablished in 2017
2015 establishments in Japan
2017 disestablishments in Japan